The Malladi Brothers, Malladi Sreeramprasad (b. June 12th, 1971) and Malladi Ravikumar (b. April 21st, 1973), are a Carnatic music vocalist duo. They started their music education under Malladi Srirammurthy and Malladi Suri Babu, their grandfather and father respectively. Subsequently they studied under Sripada Pinakapani, Nedunuri Krishnamurthy and Voleti Venkatesvarulu.

Malladi Brothers possess a large repertoire of Carnatic compositions and possess vibrant and powerful voices. Both excel in presenting Alapanas and Thyagaraja kritis. They try to popularize rare ragas and compositions to increase interest in the art form.

They have traveled extensively in India and abroad.

Albums & Songs

References & audio links

External links
 Official Website

Male Carnatic singers
Carnatic singers
Musicians from Vijayawada
Singers from Andhra Pradesh